Mendic is a synonym for several wine grape varieties including:

Folle Blanche
Gouais blanc
Graisse